Chada may refer to:

Chada, Nalgonda, a village in Andhra Pradesh, India
Chada and mongkut, crown-like traditional Thai headdresses
Chada, a character in the anime series NieA 7